Protantigius is a monotypic butterfly genus in the family Lycaenidae.
 Its single species is Protantigius superans found in the Russian Far East (Primorye), north-eastern and central China and on the Korean Peninsula.

The habitat consists of gaps, stream bottomlands and edges of deciduous forests.

Adults are on wing from mid-July to mid-August.

The larvae possibly feed on Fraxinus rhynchophylla, Alunus hirsuta, Populus koreana and/or Salix species.

Subspecies
Protantigius superans superans
Protantigius superans ginzii (Seok, 1936) (southern Primorye, Korea)

References

 Protantigius superans (Oberthur, 1914) at Insecta.pro

Theclini
Monotypic butterfly genera
Lycaenidae genera